Patayin Mo sa Sindak si Barbara is a 1974 Filipino psychological horror film directed by Celso Ad Castillo, written by Mike Relon Makiling, and starring Susan Roces as the eponymous character.

Plot
Barbara (Susan Roces) has always been overly indulgent of her little sister, Ruth's every whim. Years later, Barbara meets and falls in love with Fritz (Dante Rivero), who is smitten with her. But the spoiled Ruth (Rosanna Ortiz) confesses to her older sister that she too is in love with Fritz and threatens to kill herself if he does not marry her. So with a heavy heart, Barbara once again accommodates Ruth's demands and convinces Fritz to court her younger sister instead. In a twisted act of devotion, Fritz reluctantly agrees to marry Ruth, to prove his love for Barbara. After the wedding, Barbara decides to start a new life abroad, to give Fritz a chance to fall in love with Ruth and for Barbara to get over her feelings for him.

Her past comes back to haunt her when Barbara receives news that her younger sister has killed herself and was witnessed by Ruth's only daughter Karen (Beth Malongat). Barbara immediately returns to the Philippines to mourn her sister and comfort her unstable niece. Upon Barbara's return, she learns the reason surrounding Ruth's mysterious death.

Throughout their marriage, Ruth felt that Fritz never loved her, but harboured feelings for her sister. In a state of paranoid delusion, she suspects that Fritz was having an affair and used his business trips to the States as an excuse to rendezvous with Barbara. In a jealous rage, she commits suicide and haunts the household through a doll to exact revenge on everyone who wronged her.

Cast
Susan Roces as Barbara Enriquez
Rosanna Ortiz as Ruth E. Martinez
Dante Rivero as Fritz Martinez
Mary Walter as Benita Enriquez
Beth Manlongat as Karen E. Martinez
Edna Diaz as Erlyn
Ellen Esguerra as Ms. Esguerra
Angie Ferro as Beatriz
Venchito Galvez
Rosa Santos

Remakes
In 1995, Star Cinema remade the film as Patayin sa Sindak si Barbara with Lorna Tolentino as Barbara and Dawn Zulueta as Ruth, directed by Chito Roño and written by Ricky Lee. Only veteran actress Angie Ferro appeared on the remake in the same role as Beatriz.

In 2008, ABS-CBN bought the rights to remake the cult classic as a primetime TV Series starring Kris Aquino as Barbara for Sineserye Presents: The Susan Roces Cinema Collection, an anthology series that adapted three of Roces' well-known films for television. The program debuted with a 38.1% rating, becoming the first television remake in the Philippines with honors of a high rating.

A Remake will premier on IWant this fourth quarter titled "Barbara Reimagined". It is based on a 1995 Film. It stars Nathalie Hart as the title character, Mariel de Leon as Ruth, and JC de Vera as James.

Trivia 
 The 1974 version is produced by Rosas Productions of Jesusa Sonora-Poe, known as Susan Roces.
 The leading men of 1974 and 2008 TV series are named Fritz, while 1995 remake and 2019 web film are named Nick and James, respectively.
 In 1974 and 1995 versions, Angie Ferro is the same character named Beatriz. The characters have different personalities in the two versions. Beatriz was a fortune-teller in 1974, and in 1995, she was a witch who thought Ruth black magic and sorcery. The character was absent in the 2008 TV series and Yaya Elsa assumed the role with Tarot readings, while in 2019, it was an unknown cult member who thought Ruth/Karen black magic.
 In 1974 Ruth is just a suicidal woman due to Jealousy, Meanwhile Ruth of 1995 and 2008 was Fragile-Impulsive and feels Ignored which leads to her Suicide. While Karen in 2019 is delusional which leads to Suicide.
 Ruth/Karen in 1995 and 2019 Versions denounced her Faith to God and Believed in Satan which contributes to her Revengeful Haunting.
 In 1974 and 1995 versions, Ruth killed herself by stabbing glass shard on her stomach. In 2008 version, Ruth slashed herself with a razor on her wrist and in 2019, a kitchen knife in her wrist.
 In 1974 and 1995 versions, the possessed dolls are not named. It was in 2008 TV series, the doll is named Chelsea, while in 2019 version was named Sally.
 It was only in 2019, the antagonist character was named a different name. Mariel De Leon's character was named Karen, instead of Ruth.
 In 1974, 1995 and 2008 versions, spiritual sessions, that include Seance, are way of communicating to Ruth. While in 2019, Ruth's sprit communicates through visions of Barbara's friend.
 In 1974 and 2008 versions, Barbara and Ruth are half-siblings, while in 1995 and 2019 versions, they are biological sisters.
 In previous three versions, Karen displayed anger towards her father because of her mother's death. While in 2019, Ruth's daughter, now named Isabelle, still remained constant relationship with her father after her mother's death.
 In previous three versions, Barbara was beloved by Karen after her Mother's death. While in 2019, Barbara was antagonized by her niece through Ruth.
 In 1974 version, Yaya Benita was their Chambermaid lived in their Resthouse and was killed by Ruth. In 1995 version, Yaya Benita survived Ruth's rage, but injured. In 2008 version, Elsa is the chambermaid, who sees vision of Ruth through her third eye and forecasts through tarot readings and was killed by Ruth.
 In previous three versions, Barbara and Karen are only character survived until the end of the story. While in 2019, Barbara sacrificed herself to join Ruth/Karen.
 Fritz's Character meet Accidents due to Ruth's Revenge on his Infidelity. In 1974 he falls into Stairs by Possessed Doll, In 1995 he was beaten with Golf Club by Ruth, and in 2008 he Meets Accident while Drunk Driving with Karen, and latter is Unscatched and saved by Ruth.
 In 1974 version, Fritz is unknown to survive. While in 1995 version, sacrificed his self, in able to save Barbara. In 2008 version, instead of Fritz. It was Amanda, Ruth's mother who sacrificed herself to Ruth, able to save Barbara and Fritz. While in the 2019 version, Isabelle and James are only survived in this story.
 In 1974 version, Ruth's funeral was held in Santuario de San Jose in Greenhills in San Juan. 1995 version was held in Immaculate Heart of Mary Parish in Quezon City. In the 2008 version, it was held at the Heritage Park in Taguig. While in the 2019 version, Ruth/Karen was cremated and their ashes scattered in the sea.
 Jodi Sta. Maria and Rosanna Ortiz, actually lied in a casket for the funeral scene, while Dawn Zulueta has double to fill the funeral scene.
 In the 1974 and 2008 version, Barbara is a nurse working in the United States. In the 1995 version, she was a realtor based in United States. In the 2019 version, she was a medical intern in Canada.
 Susan Roces, The original Barbara. Essayed the role Amanda, the caring step-mother of Barbara (Kris Aquino) and selfless mother of Ruth (Jodi Sta. Maria). Amanda, is a created character for 2008 TV series.
 The 2008 TV series was supposed to be a weekly series. Because of its powerhouse cast, the management decided the TV series remake shown on primetime, throughout the month of January 2008.
 In the 2008 series, Barbara marries Fritz. While in previous versions, Barbara hides feelings for Fritz/Nick to give way for Ruth.
 In the 1974 version, Barbara was given a mirrored cross by Yaya Benita to drift Ruth's evil spirit. While in 2008, she was given a Rosary by Yaya Elsa in able to protect Ruth's revenge.
 In the 1995 and 2008 version, Barbara's family seeks the help of a priest to expel Ruth from their home, while it was absent in other versions. 
 In the 2019 version, Isabelle was not possessed by her mother. On older versions, Karen was possessed by Ruth to seek revenge on Barbara. In the 2008 series, Karen's soul was even seen roaming around the house to inform everyone that her mother's soul is in her body.
 In 2008 version, John played by Joem Bascon, is a secondary antagonist that release Ruth's spirit to backlash Dale's relationship on Agnes.
 In 2008 series, Agnes (Maja Salvador), Fritz's Sister was inspired by the character of Ms. Esguerra (Ellen Esguerra) from 1974 version.
 The maid who accompanies Barbara and Karen are: Erlyn (Edna Diaz) in 1974, Arlene (Amy Austria) in 1995, and Tina (Kitkat) in 2008.
 The exorcism scene, known as Apostles' Creed scene, was shown in 1974 and 1995 versions.

Awards and nominations

See also
Patayin sa Sindak si Barbara - a 1995 remake of the 1974 film.
Patayin sa Sindak si Barbara - a Filipino TV series based on the 1974 film.

References

External links

1974 films
1974 horror films
Films about haunted dolls
Films about spirit possession
Philippine horror films
Tagalog-language films
Films directed by Celso Ad. Castillo